The 2011 Men's EuroHockey Championship III was the 4th edition of the Men's EuroHockey Championship III, the third level of the men's European field hockey championships organized by the European Hockey Federation. It was held from 23 to 30 July 2011 in Catania, Italy.

The tournament also served as a qualifier for the 2013 Men's EuroHockey Championship II, with the finalists, Azerbaijan and Italy, qualifying.

Qualified teams
The following seven teams, shown with pre-tournament world rankings, competed in the tournament.

Results
All times are local (UTC+2).

Preliminary round

Pool A

Pool B

Fifth to seventh place classification

Pool C
The points obtained in the preliminary round against the other team are taken over.

First to fourth place classification

Semi-finals

Third place game

Final

Final standings

 Promoted to the EuroHockey Championship II

See also
2011 Men's EuroHockey Championship II
2011 Men's EuroHockey Championship IV

References

EuroHockey Championship III
International field hockey competitions hosted by Italy
Men 3
EuroHockey Championship III Men
EuroHockey Championship III Men
Sport in Catania